Lanier Boulevard Parkway is a  park in Atlanta, Georgia. It is located in the -long median of Lanier Boulevard in the Virginia Highland and Morningside/Lenox Park neighborhoods.

See also

References

Parks in Atlanta